Otto of Freising (c. 1114 – 22 September 1158) was a German churchman of the Cistercian order and chronicled at least two texts which carries valuable information on the political history of his own time. He was Otto I Bishop of Freising as from 1138. Otto participated in the Second Crusade; he lived through the journey and reached Jerusalem, and later returned to Bavaria in the late 1140s, living for another decade back in Europe.

Life
Otto was born in Klosterneuburg as the fifth son of Leopold III, margrave of Austria, by his wife Agnes, daughter of the emperor Henry IV. By her first husband, Frederick I of Hohenstaufen, duke of Swabia, Agnes was the mother of the German king Conrad III and grandmother of the emperor Frederick I. Otto's sister, Judith or Ita, was married to Marquess William V of Montferrat. Otto was thus related to the most powerful families in Germany and northern Italy.

The records of his life are scanty and the dates somewhat uncertain. He studied in Paris, where he took an especial interest in philosophy. He is said to have been one of the first to introduce the philosophy of Aristotle into Germany, and served as provost of a new foundation in Austria.

Having entered the Cistercian order, Otto convinced his father to found Heiligenkreuz Abbey in 1133, thus bringing literacy and sophisticated agriculture (including wine making) to the region that would become Vienna. He became abbot of the Cistercian monastery of Morimond in Burgundy about 1136, and soon afterwards was elected bishop of Freising. This diocese, and indeed the whole of Bavaria, was then disturbed by the feud between the Welfs and the Hohenstaufen, and the church was in a deplorable condition; but a great improvement was brought about by the new bishop in both ecclesiastical and secular matters.

In 1147 Otto took part in the disastrous Second Crusade. The section of the crusading army led by the bishop was decimated, but Otto reached Jerusalem and returned to Bavaria in 1148 or 1149. He enjoyed the favour of Conrad's successor Frederick I, was probably instrumental in settling the dispute over the duchy of Bavaria in 1156, and was present at the famous diet of Besançon in 1157. Otto mentions that Frederick I ushered in a new age of peace following years of instability and civil war.

Still retaining the habit of a Cistercian monk, he died at Morimond on 22 September 1158. In 1857 a statue of the bishop was erected at Freising, Bavaria.

Works
Otto is most remembered for two important historical works:

Chronica de duabus civitatibus
The first of these is his Chronica sive Historia de duabus civitatibus (Chronicle or The History of the Two Cities), a historical and philosophical work in eight books, which follows to some extent the lines laid down by Augustine and Orosius. Written during the time of the civil war in Germany (1143–1145), it contrasts Jerusalem and Babel, the heavenly and the earthly kingdoms, and also contains much valuable information about the history of his own time. The chronicle, which was held in very high regard by contemporaries, covers the years up until 1146, and from this date until 1209 it was continued by Otto, abbot of St Blasius (d. 1223). In the Chronica, Otto reports a meeting he had with Bishop Hugh of Jabala, who told him of a Nestorian Christian king in the east named Prester John. It was hoped this monarch would bring relief to the crusader states. This is the first documented mention of Prester John.

The text details a period of harmony between the imperial and ecclesiastical authority which had followed from the conversion of Rome to Christianity. Rome was seen as the fourth and final world empire. After that, authority was transferred to the Greeks (Byzantines), then the Franks (Francia) and later the Germans (East Francia). Also, he noted that Conrad III was the 93rd emperor from Augustus with Frederick I being the 94h. However, Pope Gregory VII's unexpected excommunication of Emperor Henry IV in 1075 had shattered this unity. And this would thus usher in the seventh and last age in mankind's history. This period would be characterised with incessant crises that would precede the arrival of the Antichrist. Which would be a topic of the eighth and final book of the Chronicle.

Gesta Friderici Imperatoris
Better known is Otto's Gesta Friderici imperatoris (Deeds of Emperor Frederick), written at the request of Frederick I and prefaced by a letter from the emperor to the author. The Gesta comprises four books, the first two of which were written by Otto and the remaining two, or parts of them, by his pupil Ragewin or Rahewin. It has been argued that the third book and the early part of the fourth were also the work of Otto. Beginning with the quarrel between Pope Gregory VII and the emperor Henry IV, the first book takes the history down to the death of Conrad III in 1152. It is not confined to German affairs, as the author digresses to tell of the preaching of Bernard of Clairvaux, of his zeal against the heretics, and of the condemnation of Pierre Abélard; he also discourses on philosophy and theology. The second book opens with the election of Frederick I in 1152 and deals with the history of the first five years of his reign, especially in Italy, in some detail. From this point (1156) the work is continued by Ragewin. Otto's Latin is excellent, and in spite of a slight partiality for the Hohenstaufen, and some minor inaccuracies, the Gesta has been described as a "model of historical composition."

References

Further reading
 Mierow, Charles Christopher. "Bishop Otto of Freising: Historian and Man", Transactions and Proceedings of the American Philological Association, Vol. 80. (1949), pp. 393–402.
 Otto, Bishop of Freising. The Two Cities: A chronicle of universal history to the year 1146 A.D. Translated with an introduction and notes by Charles Christopher Mierow; with a foreword and updated bibliography by Karl F. Morrison; edited by Austin P. Evans and Charles Knapp. Columbia University Press, 1928.

External links
 Article on his life (in German), with complete works (in Latin)
 Otto of Freising at The Latin Library

1110s births
1158 deaths
People from Klosterneuburg
12th-century Latin writers
German Cistercians
Medieval writers about the Crusades
Roman Catholic bishops of Freising
12th-century German Roman Catholic bishops
Hohenstaufen
Babenberg
12th-century German historians
Burials at Heiligenkreuz Abbey
German chroniclers
Christians of the Second Crusade
Sons of monarchs